Andrew D. Martin (born July 25, 1972) is chancellor and professor of political science and law at Washington University in St. Louis.

As an academic, Martin has contributed widely to the areas of judicial politics, quantitative political methodology, and applied statistics, with attention paid specifically to the U.S. Supreme Court.

Early Life 
Martin was raised alongside his two brothers in Lafayette, Indiana, where he attended Hershey Elementary School, East Tipp Middle School, and William Henry Harrison High School.  During that time he developed academic interests in politics and mathematics.

Education and early career 
Martin earned his A.B. from the College of William & Mary in mathematics and government in 1994 and his Ph.D. in political science from Washington University in 1998. He was assistant professor in the Department of Political Science at State University of New York at Stony Brook from 1998 to 2000.

Time on Washington University faculty 
Martin returned to his alma mater Washington University as a member of the political science faculty in 2000, just two years after earning his Ph.D. there. In 2006 he joined the faculty of the School of Law, where he played a key role in the launch of the Center for Empirical Research in the Law, serving as its founding director from 2006 to 2014. He served as chair of the Department of Political Science from 2007 to 2011 and as vice dean of the School of Law from 2012 to 2014.  In 2013 Martin was installed as the Charles Nagel Chair of Constitutional Law and Political Science.

Deanship at University of Michigan 
From 2014-2018, Martin served as dean of the College of Literature, Science, and the Arts (LSA) at the University of Michigan.  Chief among his achievements as dean, he worked closely with alumni and employers to develop the idea of the LSA Opportunity Hub, a unique program that works with LSA’s liberal arts students to integrate their academic explorations with their long-term goals and aspirations. He also led the college’s successful fundraising efforts during the latter half of the Victors for Michigan campaign, with donors giving more than $500 million to LSA. In addition, Martin led a significant expansion of the college’s diversity, equity, and inclusion efforts, including innovations such as the LSA Laptop Program, which provides computers to students with financial need; the Kessler Presidential Scholars, serving first-generation students; and the LSA Collegiate Fellows, which aimed to recruit 50 outstanding young faculty members who have expertise in equity and inclusion.

Chancellorship at Washington University in St. Louis 
Martin was appointed Washington University’s 15th chancellor by the university’s Board of Trustees on July 14, 2018. He began full-time service to the university on January 1, 2019, as Chancellor-elect, and began as Chancellor on June 1, 2019.

Since his tenure at Washington University in St. Louis began, Martin has positioned three strategic pillars at the forefront of his vision: academic distinction, educational access, and the university’s role and impact “in St. Louis and for St. Louis.”

Much of Martin's early chancellorship has been defined by the onset of COVID-19 and the university's operational and financial response. Notably, under Martin's leadership, the university was one of the first in the Midwest region to announce a residential campus shutdown and remote working operations, a decision that came ahead of local and state decisions to enforce similar restrictions. In addition, Washington University was one of the only higher education institutions in the United States to announce a delayed start, rather than an accelerated start, to the 2020 fall and 2021 spring academic terms and one of the first to reinstate retirement benefits and the university's salary merit increase program after the majority of institutions and organizations made similar budget cuts. During that time, scientists at the School of Medicine's McDonnell Genome Institute developed a saliva-based COVID-19 diagnostic test that is simple, fast, economical, and able to be utilized at a massive scale for screening and diagnostic testing.

Notable initiatives 
In February 2019, one of Martin's first announcements as Chancellor of Washington University was the creation of the university's Center for the Study of Race, Ethnicity, and Equity (CRE2). CRE2 officially launched in August 2020 and utilizes field-defining research, innovative learning, and strategic engagement in order to transform scholarship, policy, and clinical interventions where race and ethnicity are at the center.

During his inauguration on October 3, 2019, Martin announced the WashU Pledge, a financial aid program that provides a free undergraduate education to incoming, full-time Missouri and southern Illinois students who are Pell Grant eligible or from families with annual incomes of $75,000 or less. The WashU Pledge covers the full cost of a Washington University education, including tuition, room, board and fees.

In June 2020, Martin outlined a set of action steps to address issues of racial equity on Washington University's campus and throughout the St. Louis region, including the creation of an Equity and Inclusion Council, the hiring of 12 new faculty with a research emphasis on race, enhanced pedagogy and curricular programming, collaborative efforts to reimagine the university's police force and campus safety, increased supplier diversity in contracting and construction projects, and more.

In October 2021, Martin announced Gateway to Success, a $1 billion investment in financial aid that enabled the university to adopt a need-blind undergraduate admission process effective immediately. The investment was made possible largely as a result of an extraordinary 65% return on the university’s Managed Endowment Pool for the 2020-21 fiscal year. Martin said of the initiative at the time of its announcement, “Since I became chancellor nearly two years ago, becoming need-blind has been a top priority. Building on the momentum that began with our previous administration, we’re finally making it happen. This is a proud moment for us as an institution and I’m grateful to all who have contributed along the way, including generous donors who have provided scholarships and other financial support for our students.”

In October 2022, Martin and Provost Beverly Wendland launched Here and Next, the University’s globally informed, community-driven strategic vision for academic distinction. The plan aims to mobilize research, education, and patient care to establish Washington University and St. Louis as global hubs for transformative solutions to the deepest societal challenges. More than 2,000 stakeholders contributed to the plan, which is built on the guiding principles of academic distinction; community impact; equity, diversity, and inclusion; global perspective; and stewardship.

In order to advance Martin’s vision for Washington University to be the most supportive campus for students in higher ed, in October 2022 he launched Make Way: Our Student Initiative, a bold fundraising campaign that removes barriers to success for today’s diverse student population in order to cultivate a culture of equity, success, leadership, physical and mental health, civic engagement, career preparation, and financial support.

Notable Academic Scholarship, Achievements, and Honors 
Along with numerous scholarly articles and book chapters, Martin is the author of “An Introduction to Empirical Legal Research,” which he co-authored with Lee Epstein, the Ethan A.H. Shepley Distinguished University Professor at Washington University, along with “Judicial Decision-Making: A Coursebook,” which he co-authored with Barry Friedman et al. Throughout his career, Martin has received research funding from many organizations, including the Andrew W. Mellon Foundation, the MacArthur Foundation, the National Science Foundation, and the National Institutes of Health. In 2021, he was elected to the American Academy of Arts and Sciences.

In addition to his many publications, Martin's most notable scholarly achievements include the Martin-Quinn scores, where he and collaborator Kevin Quinn estimated the ideologies of U.S. Supreme Court justices, as well as his contribution to the Supreme Court Database, which documents and codes every decision by a U.S. Supreme Court justice since the Founding.

References

External links
 CERL website
 Andrew Martin's website
 WUSTL Law Faculty page
 WUSTL Political Science Faculty page

1972 births
Living people
Academics from Indiana
American political scientists
Chancellors of Washington University in St. Louis
College of William & Mary alumni
Fellows of the Society for Political Methodology
People from Lafayette, Indiana
University of Michigan faculty
Stony Brook University faculty
Washington University in St. Louis alumni
Washington University in St. Louis mathematicians
Writers from Indiana